The Women's singles competition at the 2020 FIL European Luge Championships was held on 18 January 2020.

Competition schedule
All times are (UTC+1).

Results
Two runs in one day, were used to determine the winner.

References

Women's singles